Otto von Feldmann (6 August 1873, Berlin – 20 May 1945) was a German officer and politician.
Feldmann attended the Royal Grammar School in Bydgoszcz, the Kaiser-Wilhelm-and Ratsgymnasium Hanover, the Kadettenvoranstalt in Potsdam and the main cadet institution in gross-Lichterfelde near Berlin. He joined to the Military in 1907. 1910-1912, he served as company chief in the Grenadier regiment 5, then again in the General Staff. Beginning with 1913, Feldmann changed the framework of the German military mission in the Ottoman Empire. He was initially departmental chief in the General Staff, then Chief of Staff of 1st Army and finally as Feldmann Pasha chief of surgery department at the Ottoman General Headquarters.

1873 births
1945 deaths
Politicians from Berlin
German National People's Party politicians
Alldeutscher Verband members
Members of the Reichstag of Nazi Germany
German Army personnel of World War I
Ottoman military personnel of World War I
Jauch family
Military personnel from Berlin
People from the Province of Brandenburg
Prussian Army personnel
Pashas